Backworth railway station served part of Newcastle in the English county of Northumberland, later part of Tyne and Wear. The station opened as Hotspur, replacing another Backworth station on the line to Morpeth which had been opened as Holywell.

History
Opened by the North Eastern Railway, then joining the London and North Eastern Railway, the station passed to the North Eastern Region of British Railways on nationalisation in 1948. The line had been electrified (as the Tyneside Electric) by the North Eastern Railway in 1904 to fight competition from the newly built electric tramways, but was de-electrified in the 1960s.

The station was then closed by the British Railways Board to enable the construction of the Tyne and Wear Metro, but was not re-opened as part of that system. Initially Shiremoor was the nearest metro station to the site until the 2005 opening of Northumberland Park.

The site today
The closest station to Backworth today is Northumberland Park on the Tyne & Wear Metro, located a short distance (around a twenty-minute walk from the centre of the village) to the south east.

References 
   The halt is pictured on page 23.

External links

 Backworth on navigable 1946 O. S. map

Railway stations in Great Britain opened in 1864
Railway stations in Great Britain closed in 1977
Former North Eastern Railway (UK) stations
Disused railway stations in Tyne and Wear